Start the Machine is a documentary that focuses on the break-up of Blink-182, the genesis of Angels & Airwaves, and the making of their debut album We Don't Need to Whisper. It was released on DVD on June 17, 2008. The film is named after the closing track on We Don't Need to Whisper.

Scene index
I-Empire Trailer – 2:39
Flight – 5:13
April 11, 2005 – 4:42
Writing – 4:16
"The Adventure" – 4:52
Rebirth – 4:39
David James Kennedy – 3:40
"The Gift" – 6:22
Producing – 3:44
Tom – 7:13
Big Mouth – 5:33
Breakdown – 5:19
Critter – 2:54
Atom – 3:28
Ryan – 1:34
Biographical Moment – 0:30
"The War" – 5:22
Credits – 5:21

Special features
The Reviews
More from the Studio
Tom Talks About Blink-182 and AVA
"Distraction Live"
I-Empire Movie Trailer
Music video: "The Adventure"
Music video: "Do It for Me Now"
Short film: "The War"
Short film: "The Adventure"
Short film: "It Hurts"
Short film: "The Gift"

Filming and production
Start the Machine was filmed over a course of almost 3 years. During this time, Tom DeLonge and David Kennedy (both guitarists from the band) contacted Mark Eaton and asked him to direct this documentary. Both DeLonge and Kennedy had known him for years. Eaton was trusted with the quality of the documentary completely; DeLonge never saw it or approved or disapproved anything before it was submitted to film festivals; he had "nothing to do with putting it together". Eaton would later go on to direct the videos for "Secret Crowds" and "Breathe" by Angels & Airwaves as well.

Premiere
On June 14, the documentary was exclusively premiered three days before its official release at the La Paloma Theater in Encinitas, California. No other theater showings were available for this documentary. Attendance of this show was on a first-come, first-served basis. Admission was $5, free for Modlife members. This special premiere was sponsored by Modlife, Macbeth Footwear, Loserkids, and Wahoo's and let the attendees meet the band and allowed fans to have the chance to win these door prizes:
Signed guitars and posters
Macbeth shoes
Gift certificates for Loserkids.com and Wahoo's
Modlife Premium membership accounts
Start the Machine DVDs
CDs and more

Reception
Start the Machine has been praised by Ultimate Guitar for its honesty, production, and content, receiving a rating of 9.3 out of 10.

References

External links
Start the Machine trailer
Start the Machine on MySpace
Lost footage 1 & 2

2008 films
Rockumentaries
2000s English-language films